"Slip Slidin' Away" is a 1977 song written and recorded by Paul Simon which appears on his compilation album Greatest Hits, Etc.  It was one of two new songs to appear on the album, the other being "Stranded in a Limousine".  Backing vocals on the song are provided by The Oak Ridge Boys. The song was originally recorded and considered for Simon's 1975 album Still Crazy After All These Years, but Simon decided not to include the song on the finished album.  A demo version appears on the 2004 re-issue of the album. The song was also included on Negotiations and Love Songs (1988).

Billboard found the melody to be "catchy" and the lyrics to be "sensitive. thoughtful. melancholic and evocative."  Cash Box said that "the emotionally complex lyric works around the title, which serves as the song's memorable chorus line."  Record World said that it "shows [Simon's] perception of adult problems and relationships to be undimmed."

"Slip Slidin' Away" was released as a single in October 1977 and became a major hit, peaking at No. 5 on the Billboard Pop Singles chart. The song was regularly performed at both Simon's solo concerts and Simon & Garfunkel concerts.

Personnel
 Paul Simon – vocals, acoustic guitar
 Richard Tee – Fender Rhodes
 Anthony Jackson – bass guitar
 Steve Gadd – drums
 Ralph MacDonald – temple blocks, triangle, tambourine, shakers
 The Oak Ridge Boys – backing vocals

Chart performance

Weekly charts

Year-end charts

Certifications

Other versions
The Persuasions recorded an a cappella version for their 1985 album No Frills (Rounder Records).

Recorded by Lauren Fine for her 2004 album, Paper Airports (CD Baby). Credited as "Slip Sliding Away (Paul Simon)."

Recorded by Aqualung for their 2008 album, Words and Music (Verve Forecast).

Recorded by Rita Wilson & Willie Nelson on her Now & Forever: Duets album. Released in September 2022. ℗ 2022 Sing It Loud Records LLC.

Notes

References

External links
 

1977 singles
Songs written by Paul Simon
Paul Simon songs
Song recordings produced by Paul Simon
Song recordings produced by Phil Ramone
1977 songs
Columbia Records singles